Turkey Scratch is an unincorporated community within Phillips County, Arkansas, United States.

Notable people
Levon Helm, rock multi-instrumentalist
Robert Lockwood Jr., blues musician

References

Unincorporated communities in Phillips County, Arkansas
Unincorporated communities in Arkansas